Lake George, New York may refer to one of several locations in New York State in the United States:

Lake George (lake), New York
Lake George (town), New York
Lake George (village), New York, which sits within the town of Lake George

See also
 East Lake George, New York, a hamlet
 Lake George (disambiguation)